Backlund is a Swedish surname. Notable people with the surname include:

 Albert Victor Bäcklund (1845-1922), mathematician
 Bengt Backlund (1926–2006), Swedish flatwater canoer
 Bob Backlund (born 1949), American professional wrestler
 Filip Backlund (born 1990), Swedish motorcycle road racer 
 Göran Backlund (born 1957), Swedish sprint canoer
 Gordon Backlund (born 1940), American politician and electrical engineer
 Gösta Backlund (1893—1918), Swedish footballer
 Gotthard Backlund, Swedish chess master
 Ivar Backlund (1892—1969), Swedish officer
 Johan Backlund (born 1981), Swedish ice hockey goaltender
 Jukka Backlund (born 1982), Finnish music producer
 Kaj Backlund (1945–2013), Finnish jazz trumpeter, composer, and bandleader
 Mikael Backlund (born 1989), Swedish ice hockey player
 Nils Backlund (1896–1964), Swedish water polo player
 Oskar Backlund (1846–1916), Swedish-Russian astronomer

See also
 Bäcklund (surname)

Swedish-language surnames